
This is a list of cemeteries in Warren County, Indiana.

References

External links

Protected areas of Warren County, Indiana
Cemeteries in Indiana
Warren County, Indiana
Cemeteries